Prices on My Head: Thug Money on Ya Family, Vol. 1 is a mixtape by American rapper The Boy Boy Young Mess, released in June 2009 via his label Click Clack Records and INgrooves. The first of his Prices on My Head series, it is his only album not to have any guest appearances. It peaked at #93 on the Top R&B/Hip-Hop Albums chart.

Track listing

References

External links
 https://itunes.apple.com/us/album/prices-on-my-head-thug-money/id318958545

2009 mixtape albums
Messy Marv albums